Five Fingers is an NBC adventure/drama series set in Europe during the Cold War. It was based on L. C. Moyzich's story "Operation Cicero". It ran from October 3, 1959, to January 9, 1960.

Premise 
David Hedison starred as Victor Sebastian, a counter-intelligence agent for the United States. His mission was to infiltrate a Soviet espionage ring; Five Fingers was his code name. Luciana Paluzzi co-starred as Simone Genet, a fashion model.

Episodes and guest stars

Episodes and notable guest stars include:
 
"Station Break" (Eva Gabor and Tyler McVey) – October 3, 1959
"Dossier" (Edgar Bergen) – October 10, 1959
"The Moment of Truth" (Nehemiah Persoff and Jack Warden) – October 17, 1959
"The Unknown Town" (Michael J. Pollard) – October 24, 1959
"The Men with Triangle Heads" – (Alfred Ryder) October 31, 1959
"The Assassin" (John McGiver) – November 7, 1959
"The Man Who Got Away" (Arlene Francis) – November 14, 1959
"The Emerald Curtain" – November 21, 1959
"The Temple of the Swinging Doll" (Viveca Lindfors, Clu Gulager, Rodolfo Hoyos, Jr., and Sterling Holloway) – November 28, 1959
"The Final Dream" (Cesare Danova and John Banner) – December 5, 1959
"Thin Ice" (Peter Lorre, Brett Halsey, and Alan Young) – December 19, 1959
"Operation Ramrod" (Ray Anthony) – December 26, 1959 
"The Judas Goat" (Frank de Kova) – January 2, 1960 
"The Search for Edvard Stoyan" (Martin Balsam) – January 9, 1960

Two additional episodes, "A Shot in the Dark" (Neile Adams and Joanna Cook Moore) and "Counterfeit" (Cesar Romero), were unaired.

UK theatrical runs 
In 1960/61 in the UK, 20th Century Fox used nine episodes as supporting films for circuit releases, all but one of their own main features:-
 "Final Dream" (BBFC "U" cert Nov. 21 1960) Supporting Rank's The Bulldog Breed, Rank circuit release Dec. 26th 1960
 "Counterfeit" (BBFC "U" cert Nov. 14 1960) Supporting North to Alaska, National circuit release Jan. 1st 1961.
 "The Moment of Truth" (BBFC "U" cert Feb. 23rd 1961). Supporting Five Golden Hours, National circuit release Mar. 12 1961.
 "The Emerald Curtain" (BBFC "U" cert Mar. 20 1961). Supporting All Hands on Deck, National circuit release May 7, 1961.
 "Shot in the Dark" (BBFC "U" cert May 29, 1961). Supporting Return to Peyton Place, Rank circuit release June 26, 1961.
 "Thin Ice" (BBFC "U" cert Jun. 1 1961). Supporting Wild in the Country, Rank circuit release Jul. 30 1961.
 "Dossier" (BBFC "U" cert Jul. 25 1961). Supporting Voyage to the Bottom of the Sea, National circuit release Aug. 28 1961.
 "The Judas Goat" (BBFC "U" cert Oct. 3 1961). Supporting The Queen's Guards, Rank circuit release Oct. 22 1961.
 "Temple of the Swinging Doll" (BBFC "U" cert Nov. 13 1961), Supporting Francis of Assisi, Rank circuit release Dec. 3 1961.
The Rank release played at the prime Odeon and Gaumont cinemas. The National release played at Rank's secondary outlets, although at this time it still was allocated the odd decent booking.

References

External links 
 

American adventure drama television series
NBC original programming
1950s American crime drama television series
1960s American crime drama television series
1959 American television series debuts
1960 American television series endings
Television series by 20th Century Fox Television
Black-and-white American television shows
Television series about the Cold War
Television shows set in Europe